Danesh (DMG: Daneš; English: “knowledge“) was a Persian women's journal which was edited in Tehran. It was published weekly from 1910 until 1911 in 30 issues.

History and profile
Danesh was started in 1910 and continued to be published until 1911. The editor was the wife of Hossein Khan (Kahal) and the daughter of Yaqub Jadid al Eslam Hamadani. Her own name is not known. Danesh was Iran's first journal especially for women. Political topics were not part of the content, but rather domestic issues in which the women were interested in at that time. In addition articles on topics like education and parenting were published as well as chapters of serialised novels. The frequency of Danesh which was based in Tehran became irregular over time.

Two years after the disestablishment of Danesh another women's magazine, called Shokufeh, was published in Tehran.

See also
 Zaban-e Zanan

References

Further reading
 Edward G. Browne: The Press and Poetry of Modern Persia. Cambridge 1914.
 H. L. Rabino: Ṣūrat-e jarāyed-e Īrān wa jarāyed-ī ke dar ḵārej az Īrān be zabān-e fārsī ṭabʿ šoda ast, Rašt 1911.
 M. Soltani: Fehrest-e rūz-nāmahā-ye fārsī dar majmūʿa-ye ketāb-ḵāna-ye markazī wa markaz-e asnād-e Dānešgāh-e Tehrān, marbūṭ be sālhā-ye 1267-e qamarī tā 1320-e šamsī, Tehran 1975.
 M. Mohit Tabatabai: Tārīḵ-etaḥlīlī-e maṭbūʿāt-e Īrān, Tehran 1987.

External links
 Danesh in the Encyclopædia Iranica
 Online-Version: Daneš
 Digital Collections: Arabische, persische und osmanisch-türkische Periodika

1910 establishments in Iran
1911 disestablishments in Iran
Defunct magazines published in Iran
Magazines established in 1910
Magazines disestablished in 1911
Magazines published in Tehran
Persian-language magazines
Weekly magazines published in Iran
Women's magazines published in Iran
Irregularly published magazines